William E. Coles Jr. (1932–2005) was an American novelist and professor.

Born in Summit, New Jersey, Coles earned degrees from Lehigh University, the University of Connecticut, the University of Minnesota. From 1974 to 1998 he served as a professor and director of composition at the University of Pittsburgh.

Coles died on March 21, 2005. He was survived by his wife, Janet Kafka.

Books
 The Plural I, novel (1978).
 Funnybone, novel (New York: Atheneum Books, 1992).
 Another Kind of Monday, novel (New York: Atheneum Books, 1996). 
 Compass in the Blood, novel (New York: Atheneum Books, 2001).

References

Sources
 Contemporary Authors Online. The Gale Group, 2006.
 Matthew Lavelle (2007). Pennsylvania Center for the Book: Profile of William E. Coles, Jr.. Retrieved November 29, 2008.
 Storlie, Erik F. Go Deep & Take Plenty of Root: A Prairie-Norwegian Father, Rebellion in Minneapolis, Basement Zen, Growing Up, Growing Tender. Recollections of W.E. Coles, Chapters 6-7. Createspace 2013.

1932 births
2005 deaths
Writers from Pittsburgh
University of Connecticut alumni
Lehigh University alumni
University of Minnesota alumni
University of Pittsburgh faculty
American male novelists
20th-century American novelists
20th-century American male writers
Novelists from Pennsylvania
People from Summit, New Jersey